Mastema is a genus of moth in the family Blastobasidae.

Species
Mastema occidentalis Adamski, 1989

References

Blastobasidae genera
Blastobasidae